Lake Lawn Airport,  is a privately owned public use airport located  east of the central business district of Delavan, Wisconsin, a city in Walworth County, Wisconsin, United States. The airport is part of the Lake Lawn Resort.

Although most airports in the United States use the same three-letter location identifier for the FAA and International Air Transport Association (IATA), this airport is assigned C59 by the FAA but has no designation from the IATA.

The airport does not have scheduled airline service.

Facilities and aircraft 
It has one runway: 18/36 is 4,423 by 80 feet (1,348 x 24 m) with an asphalt surface.

For the 12-month period ending June 1, 2017, the airport had 2,600 aircraft operations, an average of 50 per week: 96% general aviation, 2% air taxi and 2% military. In January 2023, there were no aircraft based at this airport.

See also
 List of airports in Wisconsin

References

External links 

Airports in Wisconsin
Airports in Walworth County, Wisconsin